878 Mildred is a minor planet in the main belt orbiting the Sun. It is the lowest numbered, and thus the namesake, of the Mildred family of asteroids, a subgroup of the Nysa family. The Mildred subgroup, and by extension 878 Mildred itself, is thought to have been formed by a recent fragmentation event from a larger asteroid.

Discovery 

878 Mildred was originally discovered in 1916 using the 1.5 m Hale Telescope at the Mount Wilson Observatory, but was subsequently lost until it was again observed on single nights in 1985 and 1991 (a lost asteroid). Initially only two observations of the asteroid were taken on 1916-09-06 which does not allow for an accurate orbital determination, however interest in the object prompted further investigation and more measurements were taken in late September and October. The asteroid was re-discovered in 1991 by Gareth V. Williams. It is named after Mildred Shapley Matthews.

Physical properties 

By comparing the asteroid's perceived brightness and the then computed distance from the Sun they arrived at an absolute visual magnitude of 14.3, which if one assumes Mars-like albedo gives an approximate diameter of 3 to 5 kilometers.

References

External links 
 Minor Planet Center Database entry on (878) Mildred
 
 

000878
Discoveries by Seth Nicholson
Discoveries by Harlow Shapley
Named minor planets
19160906